O Pobre Rabequista (The Poor Rabeca Player) is an oil painting, 1855 (oil on canvas 170 X 122 cm), by José Rodrigues.

Exhibitions 
 1855 - Universal Exhibition in Paris
 1865 - International Exposition of Porto, where he was awarded with the second medal.

It was originally purchased by Prince Consorte D. Fernando de Saxe-Coburg (Ferdinand II) and currently is in the collection of the Chiado Museum.

 In one of the editions of the Official "Litteratura Illustrada" published in Coimbra in 1860, Manuel Maria Bordalo Pinheiro, father of Rafael Bordalo Pinheiro wrote the following on this table:
The framework of "Blind Rabequista" is a genuine artistic labors, decent put up along with some pictures of Velasquez....
 The table is signed and dated and is ranked in the Chiado Museum with paragraph 515
 In the "Journal of Beaux-Arts", paragraph 3 Lisbon 1857, Rodrigo Paganino wrote several pages about the "philosophy" of this work.

External links 
   Pitoresco.com.br

Portuguese paintings
Paintings by José Rodrigues
1855 paintings
Paintings in Lisbon
Paintings of children
Musical instruments in art